Yuraq Yaku (Quechua yuraq white, yaku water, "white water", also spelled Yurac Yaco) is a mountain in the Cordillera Negra in the Andes of Peru which reaches a height of approximately . It is located in the Ancash Region, Aija Province, Aija District.

References 

Mountains of Peru
Mountains of Ancash Region